Alberto Pla y Rubio (1867–1937) was a Spanish painter interested in social issues. He was a professor of the Academy of Fine Arts in Valencia, the Academy of Fine Arts in Cadiz and the La Lonja school in Barcelona.

He was born in Castelló de la Ribera, Valencia. He studied art at the Real Academia de Bellas Artes de San Fernando in Madrid, where he was a pupil of Alejandro Ferrant y Fischermans, and in the workshop of Ignacio Pinazo Camarlench. He won a first-class medal in the National Exhibition of 1895 with a canvas entitled ¡A la guerra! ("Off to War!") and won a second-class medal at the Paris Salon of 1899. He died in Barcelona.

Rubio focused on social themes in a realistic style. He was strongly influenced by Joaquin Sorolla and impressionist brushwork, especially in the use of light in his oil paintings.

His prize-winning painting, ¡A la guerra!, belongs to the Prado, the national art museum of Spain, and currently hangs in the town hall of Alcalá de Henares.

Gallery

References

External links 

 Alberto Pla y Rubio - Artworks

1867 births
1937 deaths
People from Valencia
Painters from the Valencian Community
19th-century Spanish painters
Spanish male painters
20th-century Spanish painters
20th-century Spanish male artists
Spanish Impressionist painters
19th-century Spanish male artists